Events from the year 1852 in Ireland.

Events
5 January – the troopship HMS Birkenhead boards British Army recruits at Queenstown.  It has insufficient lifeboats.
26 February – the Birkenhead founders off the coast of South Africa. The soldiers stand to attention while women and children are placed in the lifeboats.
10 June
The 18-arch Craigmore Viaduct near Newry on the Dublin-Belfast railway line is opened (construction began in 1849).
The Irish Industrial Exhibition is opened in Cork.
1 October – Patent Law Amendment Act comes into effect in the United Kingdom, merging the English, Scottish and Irish patent systems.
Eglington Pauper Lunatic Asylum opened in Cork.
End of the Great Famine. In the period it has lasted since 1845, one million people have emigrated from Ireland. The Irish now make up a quarter of the population of Liverpool, Boston, New York, Philadelphia and Baltimore; and a half of Toronto. 
Tenant farmer Michael O'Regan emigrates from County Tipperary to London. He will become paternal great-grandfather to Ronald Reagan, President of the United States.

Arts and literature
Edmund Falconer produces his first collection of poems Man’s Mission: A Pilgrimage to Glory’s Goal whilst working as a jobbing actor.

Sport
Curragh golf course is laid out, the first in Ireland.
Leinster Cricket Club is founded in Rathgar.

Births
25 January – Nevill Coghill, posthumous recipient of the Victoria Cross for gallantry at the Battle of Isandhlwana, South Africa (died 1879).
28 January – Louis Brennan, inventor (died 1932).
2 February – Lawrence E. McGann, Democrat U.S. Representative from Illinois (died 1928).
24 February – George Moore, novelist, poet, art critic and dramatist (died 1933).
29 February – Frank Gavan Duffy, fourth Chief Justice of the High Court of Australia (died 1936).
15 March – Augusta, Lady Gregory, dramatist and folklorist (died 1932).
17 March – Patrick Augustine Sheehan, priest, author and political activist (died 1913).
27 March – Jim Connell, political activist, writer of The Red Flag (died 1929).
9 April (bapt.) – Laurence Ginnell, nationalist, lawyer and politician, member of 1st Dáil (died 1923).
28 July – Barton McGuckin, tenor singer (died 1913).
30 September – Charles Villiers Stanford, composer (died 1924).
2 October – William O'Brien, nationalist, journalist, agrarian agitator, social revolutionary, politician, party leader, newspaper publisher and author (died 1928).

Deaths
25 February – Thomas Moore, poet, singer, songwriter and entertainer (born 1779).
25 April – Arthur O'Connor, United Irishman and later general in Napoleon's army (born 1763).
8 May – Charles Rowan, joint first Commissioner of Police of the Metropolis, head of the London Metropolitan Police (b. c1782).
14 September – Arthur Wellesley, 1st Duke of Wellington, soldier and statesman (born 1769).
Full date unknown
Edward Bransfield, master in the Royal Navy (born 1785).
William Thompson, naturalist (born 1805).
Elliot Warburton, travel writer and novelist (born 1810).

References

 
1850s in Ireland
Ireland
Years of the 19th century in Ireland
 Ireland